Charles Sparrow (1808 – January 26, 1897) was the fifth mayor of Bytown.

He was born in Quebec in 1808 and moved to Bytown while still young. Sparrow owned a general store and tannery on Sussex Street in the Lower Town part of Bytown. He was elected to municipal council in 1850 and became mayor in 1851. He is buried at Notre-Dame Cemetery.

References

Bytown: The early days of Ottawa, Nick and Helma Mika

External links
 Laroque-Lafortune College, Recognized Federal Heritage Building at 445-447 Sussex Drive was once owned by Charles Sparrow

1808 births
1897 deaths
Politicians from Quebec City
Mayors of Bytown